The National Amateur Cup is the fourth tier competition of the football league system in Mongolia. Through the 2019 edition of the tournament, it was known as the National Youth Championship and adopted its current name in 2020. The tournament serves as qualification for the Mongolia Second League.

List of winners

References

Football competitions in Mongolia
Fourth level football leagues in Asia